Longcheng District ( is a district of Chaoyang City, Liaoning province, People's Republic of China.

Administrative Divisions
There are four subdistricts, four towns, and two townships in the district.

Subdistricts:
Mashan Subdistrict, Xiangyang Subdistrict, Xinhua Subdistrict, Banlashan Subdistrict

Towns:
Qidaoquanzi, Xidayingzi, Zhaoduba, Hedapingfang

Townships:
Bianzhangzi Township, Helianhe Township

References

External links

County-level divisions of Liaoning
Chaoyang, Liaoning